Michal Kohout (born 18 January 1996) is a Czech male track cyclist, representing Czech Republic at international competitions. He competed at the 2016 UEC European Track Championships in the team pursuit event.

References

1996 births
Living people
Czech male cyclists
Czech track cyclists
Place of birth missing (living people)